Jiro Nakano (中野 二郎 = Nakano Jirō) (10 April 1902 – 10 June 2000) was a Japanese composer, conductor and arranger from Aichi Prefecture. He composed works for solo guitar, solo mandolin and Mandolin orchestra.

Works

Mandolin orchestra
 Una notte di villaggio pescatori
 Capriccio sul canto d'Ainu
 Il libro pitture racconti dell antici Giapponese

Mandolin solo
 2. Fantasia
 Harugakita con variazioni
 Preghiera
 Il canto delle foglie cadute
 Notturno stellato
 Serenata
 Rêverie du soir (Notturno)
 Tre studi
 Terra natale

Guitar solo
 Tema e Variazioni (Arirang)
 30 Variazioni su un tema di Paganini
 Uno fiore
 Sentimento de Otono
 Canto de la peregrina
 Una Gaviota
 La iglesia sobre la colina
 Le Tour de reclame etincelant
 Juego de pelotilla
 Minuetto
 Pioggia de Maggio
 El camino del campo

External links
Bio

References

1902 births
2000 deaths
20th-century classical composers
20th-century Japanese composers
20th-century Japanese male musicians
Composers for the classical guitar
Japanese classical composers
Japanese classical mandolinists
Japanese male classical composers